Suzanne Josette Marguerite Schmitt (18 October 1928 — 27 October 2019) was a French tennis player.

Schmitt, a relation of tennis player Nanette le Besnerais, was active on tour in the 1950s and 1960s. She made the women's doubles final of the 1954 French Championships, where she and Maud Galtier lost in three sets to Maureen Connolly and Nell Hall Hopman. In 1955 she was a women's doubles quarter-finalist at Wimbledon. She began competing under her husband's name in the mid-1950s after marrying French engineer Denys Le Besnerais.

Grand Slam tournament finals

Doubles: 1 (1 runner-up)

References

External links
 

1928 births
2019 deaths
French female tennis players